Amoco Building may refer to:

 Amoco Building (Denver)
 Amoco Building (New Orleans)
 Aon Center (Chicago), formerly called the Amoco Building